Raman Engine is a Bipropellant Rocket engine manufactured by Skyroot Aerospace that will be used in its Vikram family of rockets. It is named after Indian Nobel laureate Sir C.V. Raman.

Description
It uses UDMH and NTO as its propellant which makes it a Hypergolic Engine. Its injector plate is completely 3D printed. This engine will be used in a cluster of 4 in the Vikram 1 rocket which can produce a thrust of 3.4 kN each producing 850 N of thrust, which is low compared to many other rocket engines, but is required for precise orbit adjustments.

Development and Testing 

 On 12 August 2020, Skyroot Aerospace successfully tested the engine for the first time.

References 

Rocket engines of India
Rocket engines using hypergolic propellant